Robert Sarah (born 15 June 1945) is a Guinean prelate of the Catholic Church. A cardinal since 20 November 2010, he was prefect of the Congregation for Divine Worship and the Discipline of the Sacraments from 23 November 2014 to 20 February 2021. Sarah previously served as secretary of the Congregation for the Evangelization of Peoples under Pope John Paul II and president of the Pontifical Council Cor Unum under Pope Benedict XVI.

Sarah has been a forceful advocate for the defense of traditional Catholic teaching on questions of sexual morality and the right to life, and in denouncing Islamic radicalism. He has called gender ideology and the Islamic State of Iraq and the Levant (ISIS) the "two radicalizations" that threaten the family: the former through divorce, same-sex marriage, and abortion; the latter with child marriage, polygamy, and the subjection of women.

He has been described as largely sympathetic to liturgical practices of the era before the Second Vatican Council, but has also proposed that partisans of different liturgies learn from each other and seek a middle ground. In 2016 Sarah called for priests to face the same direction as the congregation while celebrating Mass (ad orientem), although facing the congregation had become the prevailing practice since the Second Vatican Council. His advice was seen by some as a direct challenge to Pope Francis, a claim that Sarah rejects. An advocate of traditional Catholic marriage doctrine in opposition to same-sex marriage, he has denounced "Western homosexual and abortion ideologies", suggesting that both are of "demonic origin", and he has compared them to Nazism and Islamic terrorism.

Sarah has been mentioned as papabile, a possible candidate for the papacy, by international media outlets such as Le Monde and by Catholic publications including Crux and the Catholic Herald.

Early life and education
Sarah was born in Ourous, a rural village in then French Guinea, on 15 June 1945, the son of cultivators and converts to Christianity from animism. He is a member of the Coniaguis ethnic group in northern Guinea. In 1957, at age 12, he entered Saint Augustine Minor Seminary in Bingerville, Ivory Coast, where he studied for three years. Because in 1960 relations between newly independent Guinea and the Ivory Coast were strained, he continued his studies briefly in Conakry, Guinea, at Saint Mary of Dixinn Seminary run by the Holy Ghost Fathers, until the radical government of Guinea expropriated Church property in August 1961. After independent study at home, the Church negotiated a place for Sarah and some fellow seminarians at a government-run school in Kindia in March 1962 and then won the right to open a seminary, where Sarah earned his baccalaureate in 1964. In September of that year he was sent to study at the Grand Seminary in Nancy, France. Again deteriorating international relations, this time between Guinea and France, forced him to interrupt his studies, and he completed his theological studies in Sébikotane, Senegal, between October 1967 and June 1969. From 1969 to 1974 he studied at the Pontifical Gregorian University in Rome, where he obtained a licentiate in theology, except for the year 1971 which he spent at the Studium Biblicum Franciscanum of Jerusalem, where he obtained a licentiate in Sacred Scriptures.

Sarah speaks French, English and Italian fluently.

Presbytariate and episcopate

Sarah was ordained to the priesthood on 20 July 1969, and incardinated in the Diocese of Conakry. On 13 August 1979, Pope John Paul II appointed him Metropolitan Archbishop of Conakry. He was consecrated bishop on 8 December 1979 by Cardinal Giovanni Benelli. He served as Conakry's bishop for more than twenty years and during that tenure filled terms as president of the Guinean bishops' conference and of the Episcopal Conference of West Africa.

Archbishop under dictatorship of Sékou Touré 
Sarah served as archbishop under the dictatorship of Ahmed Sékou Touré, who put Sarah on a death-list before dying in 1984. However, despite the persecutions of priests and laymen, Sarah worked to maintain the Church as the one institution that was independent of the dictatorship. In his book God or Nothing, Sarah rebuked the Marxist dictatorship as a utopian scheme that brought misery and death.

The French daily newspaper Le Figaro reports that Sarah "did not hesitate to oppose the all-powerful Sékou Touré, then 'supreme leader of the revolution' but also a commander of violent repressions. He made the celebrated public statement: 'the power uses the man!

The Historical Dictionary of Guinea commented on Sarah's role in resisting Sékou Touré's dictatorship, writing that the Church "managed to play a remarkable role under former Archbishop Robert Sarah in Guinea's public life... Monsignor Robert Sarah is one of the most respected leaders among Guineans, who expressed their strong desire to see him lead the country's political transition on various occasions between 2006 and 2010. He arguably earned much of this popular trust by speaking truth to power during the stormiest years of president Ahmed Sékou Touré's regime, while other spiritual leaders endeavored to cater to the regime."

Cardinalate
On 20 November 2010, Pope Benedict XVI made him Cardinal-Deacon of San Giovanni Bosco in Via Tuscolana. He has the right to vote in papal conclaves until his 80th birthday. He was a cardinal elector in the 2013 papal conclave that elected Pope Francis.

He was mentioned in the press as a possible candidate for the papacy, papabile, both in 2013 and in future conclaves.

Roman Curia
On 1 October 2001, John Paul II named him secretary of the Congregation for the Evangelization of Peoples, a post he held for ten years. He used the occasion of his departure from Guinea, when he was awarded the country's highest honor, to condemn the government of Lansana Conté. He said that Guinean society was "built on the oppression of the insignificant by the powerful, on contempt for the poor and the weak, on the cleverness of poor stewards of the public good, on the bribery and corruption of the administration and the institutions of the republic".

In October 2010 he was appointed president of the Pontifical Council Cor Unum, which carries responsibility for organising Catholic relief efforts worldwide. He was the second African appointed by Pope Benedict XVI to lead a Vatican dicastery. The first was Peter Cardinal Turkson of Ghana who was appointed president of the Pontifical Council for Justice and Peace in 2009.

On 23 November 2014, Pope Francis appointed Sarah as Prefect of the Congregation for Divine Worship and the Discipline of the Sacraments.

On 21 January 2016, Sarah announced that participation in the Holy Thursday foot-washing rite (the mandatum) was no longer limited to men, following instructions from Pope Francis who had included women since the beginning of his papacy. However, in March, Sarah said that there was no obligation to include women in the ceremony.

Liturgy
On 27 May 2015 (the memorial of Saint Augustine of Canterbury), while Cardinal Sarah was serving as Prefect of the Congregation for Divine Worship and the Discipline of the Sacraments, Divine Worship: The Missal, "a legitimate adaptation of the Roman Rite, drawn up in the English Language," a new form of the Catholic Mass using the traditional language of the Book of Common Prayer, was promulgated over his signature.

Late in May 2016, Cardinal Sarah told an interviewer that the Second Vatican Council did not require priests to celebrate Mass versus populum, that is, facing the congregation. This way of celebrating Mass, he said, was "a possibility, but not an obligation". Readers and listeners should face each other during the Liturgy of the Word, he said. "But as soon as we reach the moment when one addresses God – from the Offertory onwards – it is essential that the priest and faithful look together towards the east. This corresponds exactly to what the Council Fathers wanted." Cardinal Sarah rejected the argument that priests celebrating Mass facing the East, or ad orientem, are turning their backs on the faithful or "against them".

Speaking at a London conference on 5 July 2016, Cardinal Sarah asked all bishops and priests to begin celebrating the Mass ad orientem "wherever possible", "perhaps" by 27 November 2016, the start of Advent. He encouraged all Roman rite Catholics to receive Communion kneeling and said that Pope Francis had asked him to "continue the liturgical work Pope Benedict began". Sarah then met privately with Francis and on 11 July the Holy See Press Office issued a statement that said that Sarah's London remarks had been "incorrectly interpreted, as if they were intended to announce new indications different to those given so far in the liturgical rules and in the words of the Pope regarding celebration facing the people and the ordinary rite of the Mass", that celebrating Mass facing the congregation (versus populum) was "desirable wherever possible" and not to be superseded by ad orientem. It reported that the Pope and the Cardinal were in complete agreement on these points.

He once wrote: "I refuse to waste our time pitting one liturgy against another or the rite of Saint Pius V against that of Blessed Paul VI." In July 2017, he wrote in the French magazine La Nef that he wanted the two forms of the Roman-Rite liturgy whose use is authorized by the 2007 papal document Summorum Pontificum to have the same calendar of feasts and the same Scripture readings, but that the work of a committee formed for that purpose had been unsuccessful. He still proposed that the newer form should restore certain practices that had been abandoned: that the faithful receive communion only on the tongue and while kneeling, that the prayers at the foot of the altar be included in the Mass, and that from the consecration of the host to the ablutions at the end of Mass the priest should keep thumb and index finger of each hand joined. In the older form, in which use of the vernacular language in the Scripture readings instead of Latin has only been made optional, he wished that the Scripture readings should be understood by the people. Earlier that year, Vatican spokesman Federico Lombardi criticised the expression "reform of the reform", which Sarah had used in the previous year; in his La Nef article Sarah said that the expression was best avoided and that he preferred to speak of "liturgical reconciliation".

On a related note, on 24 August 2017, Pope Francis insisted that the liturgical reforms following the Second Vatican Council were "irreversible". Some perceived this as having part of a declaration invoked in his "magisterial authority".

In September 2017, Pope Francis transferred primary responsibility "to faithfully prepare … approve and publish" translations of liturgical books into vernacular languages from the Congregation for Divine Worship and the Discipline of the Sacraments to conferences of bishops, ordering the congregation to "help the Episcopal Conferences to fulfil their task." An explanatory note, attributed to Cardinal Sarah, soon appeared, specifying that the congregation's approval would not be a mere formality but would involve a detailed review that could lead to binding rejections of unsatisfactory translations. On 22 October 2017, the Holy See released a letter that Pope Francis had sent to Cardinal Sarah, clarifying that the Holy See and its departments would have only limited authority to confirm liturgical translations recognized by a local episcopal conference.

Islam
Sarah grew up and began studying for the priesthood in countries with Islamic majorities. He was impressed by the depth of Islamic religious observance in Guinea and has praised relations between Christians and Muslims there – "the Islam in my country is a fraternal, peaceful religion". He has condemned military intervention by Western powers in Iraq and Syria, which has resulted in the near extermination of Christian communities: "I say emphatically that some Western powers will have perpetrated, directly or symbolically, a crime against humanity." He believes that there is little possibility of theological dialogue between Christians and Muslims given their essential differences (the Trinity, the Resurrection, the Eucharist), but anticipates collaboration at the national or international level on resistance to abortion, euthanasia, and "the new gender ideology".

Sarah has criticized the "pseudo-family of ideologized Islam which legitimizes polygamy, female subservience, sexual slavery, child marriage."

Views on homosexuality
Sarah has opposed various attempts to provide legal recognition to gays and lesbians, often casting his remarks in terms of a defense of traditional Catholic and African values against contemporary secular Western culture. On 28 January 2012, the Secretary-General of the United Nations, Ban Ki-moon, called on African nations to repeal laws that place sanctions on homosexual conduct. Sarah called the speech "stupid". When a journalist asked if Ban Ki-moon was "overstepping his responsibilities", Sarah replied: "Sure, you cannot impose something stupid like that. Poor countries like Africa just accept it because it's imposed upon them through money, through being tied to aid." He said that, "It's not possible to impose on the poor this kind of European mentality," and added that African bishops must react to this move against African culture.

In an interview in September 2015, Sarah described same-sex unions as "retrogressive for culture and civilisation" and a problem for all of humanity. He said that despite the fact that such unions were increasingly recognized in Europe, they were not approved of in Africa. He blamed "Western ideological colonialism" for promoting the idea of gay marriage, which he warned would "destroy Catholic doctrine". According to The Daily Telegraph, Sarah's "outspoken remarks underlined deep rifts within the Church over the Pope's softer, more compassionate attitude towards homosexuality".

Following the first session of the Synod on the Family in October 2014, Sarah objected to press coverage of the synod's discussion: "what has been published by the media about homosexual unions is an attempt to push the Church [to change] her doctrine". He said the synod's interim report or relatio appropriately objected to international agencies and governments that condition foreign aid on "the introduction of regulations based on gender ideology", but needed to underscore objections to same-sex marriage. He suggested that advocacy on behalf of same-sex unions formed "part of a new ideology of evil".

In October 2015, he played a leading role in the Synod on the Family's rejection of attempts to ensure more welcoming language toward people who are gay or divorced and remarried. Addressing the Synod on perceived threats to marriage and the family, he said, "We need to be inclusive and welcoming to all that is human; but what comes from the Enemy cannot and must not be assimilated. You cannot join Christ and Belial! What Nazi-Fascism and Communism were in the 20th century, Western homosexual and abortion Ideologies and Islamic Fanaticism are today." He said that "Western homosexual and abortion ideologies and Islamic fanaticism" could be seen as "almost like two apocalyptic beasts" with demonic origins, drew parallels between them and Nazism and Communism, and noted that terrorist attacks in France and Tunisia had taken place on the same day that the U.S. Supreme Court issued a ruling in Obergefell v. Hodges that made same-sex civil marriage legal nationwide.

Johan Bonny, Bishop of Antwerp, complained that Sarah tried to silence any discussion of the pastoral care of gay Catholics in the discussion group he led at the Synod: "There was no way of discussing it in a peaceful way." Bonny said the Belgian participants found that the growing influence of the Africans prevented the pastoral solutions they favored from getting a hearing. When Krzysztof Charamsa, a theologian who lost his position at the Congregation for the Doctrine of the Faith when he revealed that he was in a homosexual relationship on the eve of the Synod, assessed the Synod's work, he singled out Sarah's language to challenge all the participants: "No one publicly said a word against those defamatory sentences. What kind of respect does that show to us all?"

Addressing the U.S. National Catholic Prayer Breakfast on 17 May 2016, Sarah said that "God is being eroded, eclipsed, [and] liquidated" in the United States because of legal changes being adopted "in the name of 'tolerance. He cited "the legalization of same-sex marriage, the obligation to accept contraception within health care programs, and even 'bathroom bills' that allow men to use the women's restrooms and locker rooms." He asked: "Should not a biological man use the men's restroom?"

Opinion on sexual abuse
In response to Pope Benedict XVI's "Notes" on the sexual abuse crisis in the Church, Cardinal Sarah gave a talk published in L'Espresso stating that the notes "proved to be a true source of light in the night of faith that touches the whole Church... The frightening multiplication of abuses has one and only one ultimate cause: the absence of God."

Immigration
Sarah is a critic of large-scale immigration. "It is better to help people flourish in their culture than to encourage them to come to a Europe in full decadence," he said in a March 2019 interview. "It is a false exegesis to use the word of God to promote migration." In the same interview, Sarah argued that immigrants in Europe often survived in poor conditions and lived "without work or dignity."

Other appointments
On 6 January 2011, Sarah was appointed a member of the Congregation for the Evangelization of Peoples, the Pontifical Council for the Laity, and the Pontifical Council for Justice and Peace. On 10 March 2015, Pope Francis appointed Sarah to serve as a member of the Pontifical Committee for International Eucharistic Congresses.

Sarah is a member of the Dignitatis Humanae Institute.

Resignation
Pope Francis accepted Sarah's resignation as prefect of the Congregation for Divine Worship on 20 February 2021.
Cardinal Sarah was admitted to hospital on 12 July 2021 and underwent successful surgery on his prostate. He was released from hospital on 27 July 2021.

Selected writings
 
 
  While Benedict XVI is listed as coauthor of the book, his aide suggests that his role was merely advisory.

Distinctions
 : Bailiff Grand Cross of Honour and Devotion (2016)
 : Knight Grand Cross in the National Order of Benin (2015)
 : Commander of the Legion of Honour (2012)

Notes

References

External links

 
 Official website of the Congregation for Divine Worship and the Discipline of the Sacraments
 "The unstoppable rise of Cardinal Sarah", Catholic Herald
 Full text of remarks to the Synod of Bishops, 14 October 2015
 Cardinal Sarah: "We must rebuild the cathedral … We do not need to invent a new Church"

Living people
1945 births
20th-century Roman Catholic bishops in Guinea
20th-century Roman Catholic archbishops in Africa
21st-century Roman Catholic archbishops in Africa
Pontifical Council Cor Unum
Pontifical Gregorian University alumni
Cardinals created by Pope Benedict XVI
Guinean anti-communists
Guinean cardinals
Members of the Congregation for the Evangelization of Peoples
Bailiffs Grand Cross of Honour and Devotion of the Sovereign Military Order of Malta
Commandeurs of the Légion d'honneur
21st-century cardinals
Guinean anti-same-sex-marriage activists
Critics of Islamism
Roman Catholic archbishops of Conakry